The Cyberjaya City Centre MRT station, also known as Cyberjaya City Centre–Limkokwing station due to sponsorship reasons, is a mass rapid transit (MRT) station. It is one of two train stations that serves the town of Cyberjaya, the other being Cyberjaya Utara. It is one of the stations as part of the Klang Valley Mass Rapid Transit (KVMRT) project on the MRT Putrajaya Line.

Location 
Like the other station in Cyberjaya, it is located at the outskirts of the town, in that case this station is located near Limkokwing University of Creative Technology. Access to Limkokwing is not possible via walking due to station location. Feeder buses, e-hailing or taxi are required to access the certain areas within Cyberjaya.

Bus Services

Feeder buses

References

External links
 Cyberjaya City Centre MRT station | mrt.com.my
 Klang Valley Mass Rapid Transit
 MRT Hawk-Eye View

Rapid transit stations in Selangor
Sungai Buloh-Serdang-Putrajaya Line